Baroia Chak No. 36/R.B is a village located near Sangla Hill (Urdu: سانگلہ ہِل), Nankana Sahib District of the Punjab, Pakistan.
Baroia has its own hockey team. Govt boys high school operate under government control and boys were able to go to good institutions later on.

References

Populated places in Nankana Sahib District